Zanjiran (also Romanized as Zanjīrān) is a village in Khenejin Rural District, in the Central District of Komijan County, Markazi Province, Iran. At the 2006 census, its population was 162, in 47 families.

References 

Populated places in Komijan County